Carevo Polje is a village in the municipality of Jajce, Bosnia and Herzegovina. It is the place where, in 1463, Sultan Mehmed the Conqueror ordered the execution of the last King of Bosnia, Stephen Tomašević.

Historical significance
In English the name means The Emperor's Field, and is attributed to the Mehmed the Conqueror and the events surrounding Ottoman invasion and fall of Bosnian Kingdom, culminating in Bosnian king Stjepan Tomašević beheading at the location.

Demographics 
According to the 2013 census, its population was 1,189.

References

Populated places in Jajce